Said Al-Karbi is a Qatari sport shooter. He competed in the 1984 Summer Olympics.

References

Living people
Year of birth missing (living people)
Shooters at the 1984 Summer Olympics
Qatari male sport shooters
Olympic shooters of Qatar